Calameuta is a genus of insects belonging to the family Cephidae.

The genus was first described by Konow in 1896.

The species of this genus are found in Europe and Northern America.

Species:
 Calameuta filiformis
 Calameuta filum
 Calameuta pallipes

References

Cephidae
Sawfly genera